Neopilina starobogatovi is a species of monoplacophoran, a superficially limpet-like marine mollusc.

References

Monoplacophora
Molluscs described in 2007